Kieuk (character: ㅋ) is a consonant of the Korean hangul alphabet. The Unicode for ㅋ is U+314B. It is pronounced aspirated, as [kh] at the beginning of a syllable and as [k] at the end of a syllable. For example: 코 ko ("nose") is pronounced [kho], while 부엌 bueok ("kitchen") is pronounced [puʌk].

Stroke order

References 

Hangul jamo